Lost and Found (天涯海角 - Tiān Yá Hǎi Jiǎo, literally "the ends of the world") is a 1996 Hong Kong film written and directed by Lee Chi-Ngai.  It stars Kelly Chan, Takeshi Kaneshiro and Michael Wong.

Synopsis
Lam (Kelly Chan), the daughter of a shipping magnate, meets the warm-hearted Mr. Worm (Takeshi Kaneshiro) on the street one day.  Mr. Worm, a Mongol, runs a lost-and-found company and Lam enlists his help to trace a missing friend, Ted (Michael Wong), a Scottish sailor and former colleague who mysteriously disappeared months ago.  Lam and Ted formed an intimate friendship after working together and Lam finds herself thinking of him after his disappearance.  By sheer luck Mr. Worm traces Ted's whereabouts. The latter is returning home to Scotland to run a motel for his recently deceased grandfather.

While undergoing treatment for leukemia, Lam helps Mr. Worm solve near-impossible cases at his lost-and-found company.  The two develop a close bond.  As her condition deteriorates, Lam decides to pay a visit to St Kilda, Scotland to settle unfinished business with Ted.  In Scotland, her relationship with Ted almost rekindles.  But at the end of the day, she finds herself missing Mr Worm more than Ted.

Cast

Main cast 
 Takeshi Kaneshiro - Mr. Worm
 Kelly Chen - Chai Lam
 Michael Wong - Ted

Supporting cast 
 Cheung Tat-ming - Ming
 Henry Fong - Chai Ming
 Josie Ho - Yee
 Joe Ma - Ting's dad
 Steven Ma - Chai Hong
 Alan Mak - Keung
 Joyce Tang - May
 Hilary Tsui - Wai

Cameo 
 Jordan Chan - Chu 
 Moses Chan - Lone 
 Teddy Chan - Teddy 
 Maria Cordero - Jane's Mom

References

External links

 HK cinemagic entry
 
 

1996 films
1990s Cantonese-language films
Hong Kong romantic drama films
1996 romantic drama films
1996 drama films
1990s Hong Kong films